Twilight in the Desert: The Coming Saudi Oil Shock and the World Economy is a book by American investment banker Matthew Simmons. The text was initially published on June 10, 2005 by John Wiley & Sons. The book focuses on the petroleum industry of Saudi Arabia and posits that this country is approaching—or already at—its peak oil output and cannot substantially increase its oil production.

Overview

—Review on theoildrum.com

Simmons–Tierny bet

Simmons' prediction of rising oil prices made in Twilight in the Desert led to a bet with New York Times columnist John Tierney in August 2005. The two men bet US$10,000 on whether the daily price-per-barrel of crude oil averaged over the 2010 calendar year would exceed $200 when adjusted for inflation, with Simmons to win the bet if it did, or Tierney if it did not. The average price for a barrel of oil in 2010 turned out to be $80 ($71 in 2005 dollars, only slightly higher than the $65 barrel price when the bet was made). Simmons died on August 8, 2010, and the bet was paid out by his colleagues in Tierney's favor.

See also 
Similarly themed books include:
 Beyond Oil by Kenneth Deffeyes 
 Hot, Flat, and Crowded by Thomas L. Friedman
 The Future of Oil: A Straight Story of the Canadian Oil Sands by Sanjay K. Patel
 Oil 101 by Morgan Downey

References

External links
Matt Simmons “Twilight in the Desert” Saudi Arabia oil: how much left?

2005 non-fiction books
American non-fiction books
Peak oil books